Apparition was a Los Angeles-based film distribution company founded by Bob Berney and Bill Pohlad in 2009. It purchased, distributed and marketed films of a more "art house" and "cutting-edge" flavor than do major studios. It also released select films theatrically on behalf of River Road Entertainment (Pohlad's company) and Sony Pictures Worldwide Acquisitions Group.

After the 2010 American release of the 2008 film The Square, the company shut down for unknown reasons.

Notable films

References

External links

Film distributors of the United States
Mass media companies established in 2009
Mass media companies disestablished in 2010